Bengt Hagander (born 23 November 1956) is a Swedish sailor. He competed in the Flying Dutchman event at the 1984 Summer Olympics.

References

External links
 

1956 births
Living people
Swedish male sailors (sport)
Olympic sailors of Sweden
Sailors at the 1984 Summer Olympics – Flying Dutchman
Sportspeople from Malmö
20th-century Swedish people